Mycobacterium lepraemurium is a causative agent of feline leprosy.  It causes granulomatous lesions, characteristic of the Mycobacterium genus.

Description
Gram-positive, nonmotile and strongly acid-fast rods (3-5 µm long). Slightly rounded ends.

Colony characteristics
Rough nonchromogenic colonies.

Physiology
Growth on inspissated 1% egg yolk medium at 30 °C - 37 °C within 4–5 weeks (using large inocula, confined to a concentrated area of the medium, egg white is inhibitory).

Pathogenesis
Cause of endemic disease of rats in various parts of the world, as well as feline leprosy.
feline leprosy is transmitted by bites from rats and other cats.
Disease occurs mainly in the skin and lymph nodes, causing induration, alopecia and eventual ulceration.
Nodular lesions, involving subcutaneous tissues, may be solitary or multiple and usually confined to the head region or the limbs.  Nodules are fleshy and freely movable.
Surgical excision of the lesions is the preferred treatment.
Only the densely and uniformly stained forms appear to be infectious for animals, in contrast to the degenerate unevenly stained forms.
Biosafety level 2

Type strain
None specified due to difficulties in cultivation.

References

Acid-fast bacilli
lepraemurium
Leprosy
Cat diseases
Bacteria described in 1912